Keith Ellison (born 1963) is the Attorney General of Minnesota and former member of the U.S. Congress from Minnesota. 

Keith Ellison may also refer to:

Keith Ellison (American football) (born 1984), American football linebacker
Keith P. Ellison (born 1950), U.S. federal judge